East Suffolk is a local government district in Suffolk, England, which was established on 1 April 2019, following the merger of the existing Suffolk Coastal and Waveney districts.  At the 2011 census, the two districts had a combined population of 239,552.

The main towns and villages in the district include Aldeburgh, Beccles, Bungay, Felixstowe, Framlingham, Halesworth, Leiston, Lowestoft, Saxmundham and Southwold as well parts of the wider Ipswich built-up area including Kesgrave, Martlesham and Woodbridge.

The district covers a smaller area compared to the former administrative county of East Suffolk, which was abolished by the Local Government Act 1972.

Governance 

As of the 2019 elections on 2 May, the composition of East Suffolk Council is as follows:

See also
2019 structural changes to local government in England
West Suffolk, another district that was created in Suffolk on 1 April 2019.

References

External links

 
Non-metropolitan districts of Suffolk